A Meker–Fisher burner, or Meker burner, is an ambient air laboratory burner that produces multiple open gas flames, used for heating, sterilization, and combustion. It is used when laboratory work requires a hotter flame than attainable using a Bunsen burner, or used when a larger-diameter flame is desired, such as with an inoculation loop or in some glassblowing operations. The burner was introduced by French chemist Georges Méker in an article published in 1905.

Compared with a Bunsen burner, the lower part of its tube has more openings with larger total cross-section, admitting more air and facilitating better mixing of air and gas. The tube is wider, and its top is covered with a plate mesh, which separates the flame into an array of smaller flames with a common external envelope, ensures uniform heating, and also preventing flashback to the bottom of the tube, which is a risk at high air-to-fuel ratios and limits the maximal rate of air intake in a Bunsen burner. The flame burns without noise, unlike the Bunsen or Teclu burners.

See also 
 Bunsen burner
 Teclu burner

References

External links 

 Video of Meker burner in use.

Burners
Laboratory equipment